Longuenesse is a commune in the Pas-de-Calais department in the Hauts-de-France region of France.

Geography
Longuenesse is a large suburb of Saint-Omer, one mile southwest of the centre, on the D928 road.

Population

Places of interest
 The church of St.Quentin, dating from the nineteenth century.
 An old abbey hostel.
 The fountain of Saint-Quentin.
 Vestiges of a monastery founded in 1298.

Twin towns
 Vedrin, in Belgium

See also
Communes of the Pas-de-Calais department

References

Communes of Pas-de-Calais
Saint-Omer